McKnight (also MacKnight, Macknight) is a Scottish (Ulster-Scots) surname. It is a derivative of the surname MacNaught/McNaught.

Notable people with the surname include

A
Allen McKnight (born 1964), Northern Irish footballer
Angela V. McKnight (born 1977), American politician
Ann McKnight, American film editor
Anna Caulfield McKnight (1866–1947), American lecturer
Anne McKnight (1924–2012), American soprano
Anthony McKnight (1954–2019), American serial killer

B
Bailey McKnight (born 1990), Canadian cyclist
Beeban McKnight (1897–1996), New Zealand entertainer
Bert McKnight (1883–1961), Australian rules footballer
Beverly McKnight, Canadian synchronized swimmer
Bill McKnight (1940–2019), Canadian politician
Bob McKnight (1938–2021), Canadian ice hockey player
Brian McKnight (born 1969), American singer-songwriter
Brian E. McKnight (born 1936), American Sinologist, Sung Dynasty

C
Cezar McKnight (born 1973), American politician
Chad McKnight (born 1984), American basketball player
Charles McKnight (1750–1791), American physician
Clarence E. McKnight Jr. (born 1929), American general

D
David McKnight (1935–2006), Canadian-British anthropologist
Dennis McKnight (born 1959), American football player
Denny McKnight (1848–1900), American baseball executive and manager
Denyss McKnight (born 1982), Canadian musician
DeWayne McKnight (born 1954), American guitarist
Diane McKnight (born 1953), American professor
Dodge MacKnight (1860–1950), American painter
Dorothy McKnight, American athletic administrator

E
Edwin T. McKnight (1869–1935), American politician

G
Graham McKnight (born 1986), English Theatre practitioner

I
Ian McKnight, Jamaican activist

J
Jack McKnight (born 1994), West Indian footballer
James McKnight (disambiguation), multiple people
Jeff McKnight (born 1963), American baseball player
Jim McKnight (1936–1994), American baseball player
Jimmy McKnight (1923–1999), Australian rules footballer
Joe McKnight (1988–2016), American football player
Joe McKnight (politician) (born 1933), American politician
John McKnight (disambiguation), multiple people

K
Kaila McKnight (born 1986), Australian runner
Ken McKnight (born 1964), New Zealand cricketer

L
Lauren McKnight (born 1988), American actress
Linda McKnight, American bassist

M
Marian McKnight (born 1936), American beauty pageant contestant
Martaveous McKnight (born 1997), American basketball player
Matt McKnight (born 1984), Canadian ice hockey player
Mike McKnight, American keyboardist

P
Paul McKnight (born 1977), Northern Irish footballer

Q
Quincy McKnight (born 1995), American basketball player

R
Reginald McKnight (born 1956), American novelist
Rhema McKnight (born 1984), American football player
Richard McKnight (born 1977), Scottish rugby union footballer
Robert McKnight (1820–1885), American politician
Robert W. McKnight (born 1944), American businessman
Romeo McKnight (born 1998), American football player

S
Sam McKnight (born 1955), American hairstylist
Scot McKnight (born 1953), American theologian
Scotty McKnight (born 1988), American football player
Shawn McKnight (born 1968), American bishop
Sidney McKnight (born 1955), Canadian boxer
Sparkle McKnight (born 1991), Trinidadian athlete
Stephanie McKnight (born 1960), American Virgin Island cyclist
Stewart McKnight (1935–2021), New Zealand cricketer

T
Ted McKnight (born 1954), American football player
Terence E. McKnight (born 1956), American naval officer
Thomas McKnight (born 1941), American artist
Thomas McKnight (Iowa pioneer) (1787–1865), American pioneer
Tim McKnight, American biologist
Tom McKnight (1868–1930), English footballer
Tony McKnight (born 1977), American baseball player

W
Wes McKnight (1909–1968), Canadian television personality
William McKnight (1842–1914), American sailor
William L. McKnight (1887–1978), American businessman
Willie McKnight (1918–1941), Canadian aviator

See also
Senator McKnight (disambiguation), a disambiguation page for Senators surnamed "McKnight"

Surnames of Ulster-Scottish origin
Anglicised Scottish Gaelic-language surnames